Richard Muscat (born 9 July 1992) is an Australian racing driver currently co-driving in the Pirtek Enduro Cup for Garry Rogers Motorsport, alongside James Golding. He won the Australian GT Championship outright in 2014.

Racing record

Career results

Supercars Championship results

Bathurst 1000 results

References

1992 births
Living people
Supercars Championship drivers
Australian racing drivers
Racing drivers from Melbourne
Sportsmen from Victoria (Australia)
Porsche Carrera Cup GB drivers
24H Series drivers

Garry Rogers Motorsport drivers